The South Indian Railway Company operated a number of  gauge lines in South India from 1874 to 1951.

History 
The Great Southern of India Railway Company was established with its headquarters in England in 1853. The Carnatic Railway Company was founded in 1869. The two companies merged in 1874 to form the South Indian Railway Company.  The new firm was registered in London in 1890 with Trichinopoly as its headquarters. In 1891, the Pondicherry Railway Company (incorporated in  1845) merged with the South Indian Railway Company. The company moved its headquarters later to, Chennai Central. The company operated a suburban electric train service for Madras city from May 1931 onwards. The South Indian Railway Company was nationalized in 1944. On 1 April 1951, the South Indian Railway Company, the Madras and Southern Mahratta Railway Company and the Mysore Railway Company were merged to form the Southern Railway zone of the Indian Railways.

Rolling stock 
By the end of 1877 the company owned 97 steam locomotives, 366 coaches and 1643 goods wagons. By 1936, the rolling stock had increased to 557 locomotives, 27 railcars, 1610 coaches and 9779 freight wagons.

Classification
It was labeled as a Class I railway according to Indian Railway Classification System of 1926.

Conversion to broad gauge 
The railway lines were converted to  broad gauge in the 1990s.

See also 
 1928 South Indian Railway Strike
 Southern Railway zone

References

Notes

Bibliography

External links 

 Transport in Madurai
 Transport in Chennai
 Rail transport in Tiruchirappalli
 Defunct railway companies of India
Southern Railway zone
 Rail transport in Tamil Nadu
 Railway companies established in 1874
 Railway companies disestablished in 1951
1874 establishments in British India
1951 disestablishments in India
Indian companies established in 1874